Jawbar (also spelled Jobar) is a village in central Syria, administratively part of the Homs Governorate, located south of Homs. According to the Syria Central Bureau of Statistics (CBS), Jawbar had a population of 4,242 in the 2004 census. Its inhabitants are predominantly Sunni Muslims.

References

Populated places in Homs District